Organomercury chemistry refers to the study of organometallic compounds that contain mercury. Typically the Hg–C bond is stable toward air and moisture but sensitive to light. Important organomercury compounds are the methylmercury(II) cation, CH3Hg+; ethylmercury(II) cation, C2H5Hg+; dimethylmercury, (CH3)2Hg, diethylmercury and merbromin ("Mercurochrome"). Thiomersal is used as a preservative for vaccines and intravenous drugs.

The toxicity of organomercury compounds presents both dangers and benefits.  Dimethylmercury in particular is notoriously toxic, but found use as an antifungal agent and insecticide. Merbromin and phenylmercuric borate are used as topical antiseptics, while nitromersol is used as a preservative for vaccines and antitoxins.

Synthesis
Organomercury compounds are generated by many methods, including the direct reaction of hydrocarbons and mercury(II) salts.  In this regard, organomercury chemistry more closely resembles organopalladium chemistry and contrasts with organocadmium compounds.

Mercuration of aromatic rings
Electron-rich arenes undergo mercuration upon treatment with Hg(O2CCH3)2. The one acetate group that remains on mercury can be displaced by chloride:
C6H5OH + Hg(O2CCH3)2 → C6H4(OH)–2-HgO2CCH3 + CH3CO2H

C6H4(OH)–2–HgO2CCH3 + NaCl → C6H4(OH)–2-HgCl + NaO2CCH3

The first such reaction, including a mercuration of benzene itself, was reported by Otto Dimroth between 1898 and 1902.

Addition to alkenes
The Hg2+ center binds to alkenes, inducing the addition of hydroxide and alkoxide.  For example, treatment of methyl acrylate with mercuric acetate in methanol gives an α--mercuri ester:

Hg(O2CCH3)2 + CH2=CHCO2CH3 → CH3OCH2CH(HgO2CCH3)CO2CH3

The resulting Hg-C bond can be cleaved with bromine to give the corresponding alkyl bromide:

CH3OCH2CH(HgO2CCH3)CO2CH3 + Br2 → CH3OCH2CHBrCO2CH3 + BrHgO2CCH3

This reaction is called the Hofmann-Sand Reaction.

Reaction of Hg(II) compounds with carbanion equivalents
A general synthetic route to organomercury compounds entails alkylation with Grignard reagents and organolithium compounds. Diethylmercury results from the reaction of mercury chloride with two equivalents of ethylmagnesium bromide, a conversion that would typically be conducted in diethyl ether solution. The resulting (CH3CH2)2Hg is a dense liquid (2.466 g/cm3) that boils at 57 °C at 16 torr. The compound is slightly soluble in ethanol and soluble in ether.

Similarly, diphenylmercury (m.p. 121–123 °C) can be prepared by reaction of mercury chloride and phenylmagnesium bromide. A related preparation entails formation of phenylsodium in the presence of mercury(II) salts.

Other methods
Hg(II) can be alkylated by treatment with diazonium salts in the presence of copper metal.  In this way 2-chloromercuri-naphthalene has been prepared.

Phenyl(trichloromethyl)mercury can be prepared by generating dichlorocarbene in the presence of phenylmercuric chloride.  A convenient carbene source is sodium trichloroacetate. This compound on heating releases dichlorocarbene:
C6H5HgCCl3  →  C6H5HgCl  +  CCl2

Reactions
Organomercury compounds are versatile synthetic intermediates due to the well controlled conditions under which they undergo cleavage of the Hg-C bonds.  Diphenylmercury is a source of the phenyl radical in certain syntheses.  Treatment with aluminium gives triphenyl aluminium:

3 Ph2Hg + 2 Al → (AlPh3)2 + 3 Hg

As indicated above, organomercury compounds react with halogens to give the corresponding organic halide.
Organomercurials are commonly used in transmetalation reactions with lanthanides and alkaline-earth metals.

Cross coupling of organomercurials with organic halides is catalyzed by palladium, which provides a method for C-C bond formation.
Usually of low selectivity, but if done in the presence of halides, selectivity increases.  Carbonylation of lactones has been shown to employ Hg(II) reagents under palladium catalyzed conditions. (C-C bond formation and Cis ester formation).

Applications
Due to their toxicity and low nucleophilicity, organomercury compounds find limited use. The oxymercuration reaction of alkenes to alcohols using mercuric acetate proceeds via organomercury intermediates. A related reaction forming phenols is the Wolffenstein–Böters reaction. The toxicity is useful in antiseptics such as thiomersal and merbromin, and fungicides such as ethylmercury chloride and phenylmercury acetate.

Mercurial diuretics such as mersalyl acid were once in common use, but have been superseded by the thiazides and loop diuretics, which are safer and longer-acting, as well as being orally active.

Thiol affinity chromatography
Thiols are also known as mercaptans due to their propensity for mercury capture. Thiolates (R-S−) and thioketones (R2C=S), being soft nucleophiles, form strong coordination complexes with mercury(II), a soft electrophile.  This mode of action makes them useful for affinity chromatography to separate thiol-containing compounds from complex mixtures. For example, organomercurial agarose gel or gel beads are used to isolate thiolated compounds (such as thiouridine) in a biological sample.

See also
Heavy metal poisoning
Mercury poisoning
Minamata disease

References

External links
 
 
 Safety data for a typical organomercury compound: 

 
Obsolete pesticides